The director of the Central Intelligence Agency (D/CIA) is a statutory office that functions as the head of the Central Intelligence Agency, which in turn is a part of the United States Intelligence Community.

The director reports to the director of national intelligence (DNI) and is assisted by the deputy director of the Central Intelligence Agency (DD/CIA). The director is a civilian or a general or flag officer of the United States Armed Forces nominated by the president of the United States, with the recommendation from the DNI, and must be confirmed by a majority vote of the United States Senate.

History

Before April 21, 2005, the director of Central Intelligence (DCI) headed both the Intelligence Community and the Central Intelligence Agency. In addition, DCI served as an advisor to the president of the United States on intelligence matters and was the statutory intelligence advisor to the National Security Council (NSC). On April 21, 2005, the director of national intelligence (DNI) took on the roles as head of the Intelligence Community and principal intelligence advisor to the president and the NSC.

The post of DCI was established in 1946 by President Harry S. Truman; it thus predates the establishment of the Central Intelligence Agency (created by the National Security Act of 1947). After the end of World War II, the Office of Strategic Services was dismantled and its functions were split between the departments of state and war (now defense).  President Truman soon recognized the inefficiency of this arrangement and created the Central Intelligence Group, which could be considered a smaller precursor to the National Security Council.  The following year the National Security Act of 1947 created the Central Intelligence Agency and National Security Council, while formally defining the duties of the director of Central Intelligence.  The duties of the DCI had been further defined over the years by tradition, congressional acts, and Executive Orders.

Beginning February 2017, the D/CIA was elevated to Cabinet of the United States level status, as designated by the Trump administration. This ended with the beginning of the Biden administration.

Order of succession
The order of succession determines which official shall act and perform the functions and duties of the director in the event the director dies, resigns, or otherwise becomes unable to perform their duties. The official will serve as Acting Director.

If the official is already serving in an acting capacity, or otherwise not eligible under the Federal Vacancies Reform Act of 1998, the order skips to the next person in line. However, the president of the United States retains discretion to depart from the list in designating an acting director.

List of directors

See also 

 Chief, IRS Criminal Investigation
 Director of the Federal Bureau of Investigation
 Director of the United States Marshals Service
 Director of the United States Secret Service

References

2005 establishments in the United States